The centerfold or centrefold of a magazine is the inner pages of the middle sheet, usually containing a portrait, such as a pin-up or a nude. The term can also refer to the model featured in the portrait. In saddle-stitched magazines (as opposed to those that are perfect-bound), the centerfold does not have any blank space cutting through the image.

The term was coined by Hugh Hefner, founder of Playboy magazine. The success of the 1953 first issue of Playboy has been attributed in large part to its centerfold: a nude of Marilyn Monroe. The advent of monthly centerfolds gave the pin-up a new respectability, and helped to sanitize the notion of "sexiness". Being featured as a centerfold could lead to film roles for models, and still occasionally does today.

Early on, Hefner required Playboy centerfolds to be portrayed in a very specific way, telling photographers in a 1956 memo that the "model must be in a natural setting engaged in some activity 'like reading, writing, mixing a drink'...[and]... should have a 'healthy, intelligent, American look—a young lady that looks like she might be a very efficient secretary or an undergrad at Vassar.'"  Hefner later said that the ideal centerfold is one in which "a situation is suggested, the presence of someone not in the picture"; the goal was to transform "a straight pinup into an intimate interlude, something personal and special."

Some magazines later adopted the practice of having a trifold or quatrefold centerfold, using a longer sheet of paper at that spot and folding the extra length into the magazine. Racier adult magazines used this space to showcase more explicit imagery: "In order to represent breasts, genitals, anus, and face all within the tri-fold frame of the centerfold, models were propped up, legs spread, raised, and then jack- knifed against their bodies, arms plunged between them to spread the labia."

Though the term has become linked in the public consciousness with erotic material or models, many other magazines such as Life, Time and National Geographic have published fold-out spreads on other subjects.

Titles
Some magazines will refer to their centerfold models with a specific name, which may be connected to the magazine's brand or theme.
When obtained from one of the more prestigious publications in the field, it can become a semi-formal personal title used in news articles and introductions long after the model's centerfold appearance.

Some online-only media outlets maintain a monthly designation reminiscent of a print magazine centerfold; for example, the Twistys Treat.

References

Graphic design
Pin-up art
Playboy
Publishing
Pornography terminology